Cathriona Foley (born 1986 in Cork) is a Lecturer in University College Cork and camogie player and winner of All Ireland medals in 2005, 2006, 2008 and 2009. She won All Star awards in 2007, 2008 and 2009.
Cathriona captained Cork to the All-Ireland Senior title in 2008 and is also the holder of an All-Ireland Minor medal as well as provincial honours at Minor, Junior, Intermediate and Senior. Holds a Junior 'B', Junior 'A' and Senior 'B' county championship medal with her club and won a Senior 'A' championship title while captaining divisional side Muskerry in 2007. Her father, Dan Joe, won a minor hurling All-Ireland with Cork. Cathriona is the holder of All Star awards and has lined out with UCC in the Ashbourne Cup. Sisters Mairéad and Colleen and brother Daniel wore the Cork colours at under-age level.

References

External links 
 Official Camogie Website
  Denise Cronin’s championship diary in On The Ball Official Camogie Magazine
 https://web.archive.org/web/20091228032101/http://www.rte.ie/sport/gaa/championship/gaa_fixtures_camogie_oduffycup.html Fixtures and results] for the 2009 O'Duffy Cup
 All-Ireland Senior Camogie Championship: Roll of Honour
 Video highlights of 2009 championship Part One and part two
 Video Highlights of 2009 All Ireland Senior Final
 Report of All Ireland final in  Irish Times Independent and Examiner

1986 births
Living people
Cork camogie players
UCC camogie players